Max Lahiff (born 9 December 1989) is an English rugby union footballer who plays as a loosehead prop for Bristol in the Gallagher Premiership.

Early life

Lahiff was born in London and was educated at  Papplewick School in Ascot followed by Wellington College Berkshire where he was a member of the team that won the Under 18 Daily Mail Cup.   He had spells with London Welsh and the London Irish Academy as a youngster.

Career

He made his senior debut for London Irish against London Wasps in 2009 and made a total of 78 appearances in his 4 years playing for the Exiles.   During this time he gained a reputation for strong scrummaging and a physically imposing style of play.

It was announced that he would leave Irish at the end of the 2012–13 season and link up with the Melbourne Rebels ahead of their 2014 Super Rugby campaign.   He also spent a season playing ITM Cup rugby in New Zealand for the  Magpies.

Lahiff qualifies to play international rugby for  through his father.

On 30 January 2015, Bath Rugby confirmed the signing of Lahiff with immediate effect. Rejoining Toby Booth and Neal Hatley, who were coaches at London Irish during his spell there, Lahiff was named in the squad to play Harlequins in the LV= Cup the next day.

Lahiff signed for French Top 14 side Clermont as cover during the 2019 Rugby World Cup, but the deal was called off due to a medical issue. Lahiff joined Bristol Bears on a one-year contract for the 2019-20 season which has since been extended.

References

External links 
Rebels profile

1989 births
Living people
Rugby union props
Bath Rugby players
English rugby union players
English people of Australian descent
Rugby union players from London
English expatriate rugby union players
Expatriate rugby union players in Australia
Melbourne Rebels players
Expatriate rugby union players in New Zealand
Hawke's Bay rugby union players
London Irish players
London Welsh RFC players
Bristol Bears players
People educated at Papplewick School
People educated at Wellington College, Berkshire